Lalu may refer to:

People
Lalu Muhammad Zohri, an Indonesian sprinter
Lalu Prasad Yadav, an Indian politician
Shahidul Islam (Lalu), the youngest Bangladeshi to receive the Bir Pratik award
Polly Bemis, born Lalu Nathoy, a Chinese American pioneer woman
Vivien Lalu (also known as Lalu), a French metal keyboardist, composer and producer

Others
 Lalu, Nepal
 Lalu (ละลุ), natural rock formations caused by erosion in Sa Kaeo Province, Thailand